Murphy Cove is a community on the Eastern Shore of Nova Scotia, Canada, in the Halifax Regional Municipality. The community is named for Thomas Murphy, an Irish settler. The community is situated on the shores of Shoal Bay, an inlet of the Atlantic Ocean. Settlement in the area began in the 1830s.

References

Citations

Bibliography

Communities in Halifax, Nova Scotia
General Service Areas in Nova Scotia